Eco Park (or Prakriti Tirtha) is an urban park in New Town, Greater Kolkata, India. The park is situated on a  plot and is surrounded by a  waterbody with an island in the middle. The park was conceptualised by Chief Minister of West Bengal, Mamata Banerjee in July 2011. West Bengal Housing Infrastructure Development Corporation (HIDCO) is the overarching body coordinating the construction of the park,  along with different other government bodies responsible for implementation of different works inside the park.

The park has been divided into three broad parts; 1) ecological zones like wetlands, grasslands, and urban forest, 2) theme gardens and open spaces, 3) and urban recreational spaces. The Eco Park is further divided into different sub-parts according to the different types of fauna planted. The copies of the Seven Wonders of the World have also been made for people to visit in this park. According to the plan, the park will have different areas like wild flower meadows, a bamboo garden, grasslands,  tropical tree garden,  bonsai garden*, tea garden, Cactus Walk*, a heliconia garden*, a butterfly garden, a play area and an amphitheatre(*-yet to be added). Further, there is plan to develop an eco-resort in public-private partnership, and will also include an area where handicrafts from different part of the state will be exhibited. The park was inaugurated on 29 December 2012 by Mamata Banerjee.  Etc.

Location
The park is surrounded by the Kolkata Museum of Modern Art on the North, the upcoming Central Business District and International Financial Hub on the east, the Kolkata International Convention Center, HIDCO Bhawan and Rabindra Tirtha on the south and existing human settlement of Jatragachi/Hatiara on the West. It is well connected with VIP Road and EM Bypass. Buses are available from Ultadanga, Baguiati, Kolkata Airport, Salt Lake and Chingrighata.

Areas

According to the masterplan made by Bengal Urban Infrastructure Development Limited, the park has been divided into the following areas:
 Active Zone - Consisting of Visitor center, Restaurants, Food courts, Urban Museum, Crafts Haat, Seven Wonders
 Theme Area (North) - Consisting of Maidan (open field), Amphitheatre, children's play area, Chinese garden, formal garden, Bonsai garden, Cactus walk, Butterfly garden, heliconia garden and mist house and bamboo garden
 Theme Area (South) - Play area, tea plantation, Water garden and utility area
 Lake Zone - A bridge connecting the island, Bengali restaurant, Sculpture court, Lakefront Promenade, Wildflower meadows
 3 different Eco-zones consisting of wetlands, grasslands, tropical and mixed-moist deciduous forests.

Places of interest

Activities

Eco Park Rides Rate Chart.

Special events 
On 5 January 2013, Vokatta - a kite festival was organized by Benchmark Developers Pvt. Ltd, in association with HIDCO (West Bengal Housing Infrastructure Development CorporationLimited) in Eco Park ground. There was an open invitation for all to participate after 11 AM onwards.

On 5 January 2014, again Vokatta-2014 was organised by Benchmark NewTown Kolkata International Kite Festival Trust, In co operation with WBHIDCO. Kite fliers from the UK, Netherlands, Belgium, Italy, the US, Singapore and Malaysia participated in Vokatta 2014. National kite fliers from Ahmedabad, Bengaluru, Kochi, Mumbai and Rajkot also joined the festivity, This year, the emphasis was on Fancy kites. Hot Air Balloon was another attraction.

See also 
HIDCO
List of national parks of India
Ecotourism
Kolkata Museum of Modern Art
Nicco Park

References

External links

Official Website
 Official homepage

Parks in Kolkata
Urban public parks
Buildings and structures in Kolkata
New Town, Kolkata